Novets is a rural locality (a village) in Piksimovksoye Rural Settlement, Vashkinsky District, Vologda Oblast, Russia. The population was 15 as of 2002.

Geography 
Novets is located 36 km northwest of Lipin Bor (the district's administrative centre) by road. Ushakovo is the nearest rural locality.

References 

Rural localities in Vashkinsky District